Cragus or Cragos or Kragos was an ancient city in Cilicia, Asia Minor at the foot of Mount Cragus; its location is in modern-day Antalya Province, Turkey.  Some scholars claim that it is the same city as Antiochia ad Cragum.

References

Ancient Greek archaeological sites in Turkey
Former populated places in Cilicia